Bright Future is the third studio album from Japanese girl group Empire. It was released on November 10, 2021, by Avex. The album consists of thirteen tracks.

Track listing

Charts

References

2021 albums
Empire (Japanese band) albums
Japanese-language albums